Kainoa T. Correa is an American professional baseball coach. He is the bench coach and infield/baserunning instructor for the San Francisco Giants of Major League Baseball (MLB). He played college baseball for the University of Puget Sound. Correa is of Native Hawaiian, Portuguese, and Japanese descent.

High school and college
Correa attended Waiakea High School in Hilo, Hawaii. He attended the University of Puget Sound, where he played college baseball as an infielder for four years (2007–2010). He graduated with a degree in U.S. History.

Coaching career
Correa joined the Puget Sound coaching staff after graduating, and spent the 2010–2011 through 2013–2014 seasons there. During his time there, his roles included head assistant coach, recruiting coordinator, infield coach, third-base coach, academic advisor, and overseeing the team's strength and conditioning program. Correa then moved on to the University of Northern Colorado, where he spent four seasons. His first was as a volunteer assistant, and final three as a full-time assistant coach. He served as the overall defensive coordinator, infield coach, third base coach, and as the recruiting coordinator. He drew a following for posting baseball videos on social media.

Correa joined the Cleveland Indians organization in 2018, and served as the AZL Indians infield coach that season. He spent the 2019 season as the Indians short-season defensive coordinator.

Prior to the 2020 season, Correa joined the San Francisco Giants coaching staff as their bench coach and infield/baserunning instructor.

References

External links
From D-III to the major leagues: Kai Correa’s unusually quick journey to the Giants bench The Mercury News, January 22, 2020
Puget Sound Loggers bio
Northern Colorado Bears bio

Living people
People from Hilo, Hawaii
Baseball coaches from Hawaii
Baseball players from Hawaii
Baseball infielders
Major League Baseball bench coaches
San Francisco Giants coaches
Puget Sound Loggers baseball players
Puget Sound Loggers baseball coaches
Northern Colorado Bears baseball coaches
Minor league baseball coaches
University of Puget Sound alumni
1988 births